Bradbury is an English toponymic surname, derived from Bredbury in historic Cheshire, or sometimes from Bradbury in County Durham. Notable people with the surname include:

Lady Joan Bradbury (née Leche) (c. 1465 – 1530)
Baron Bradbury, a title in the Peerage of the United Kingdom, including three barons with the surname Bradbury
Bill Bradbury (born 1949), American politician and Oregon Secretary of State
Bettina F. Bradbury, American soap opera writer
Bettina Bradbury, Canadian author and academic
Edward Kinder Bradbury (1881–1914), British soldier and recipient of the Victoria Cross
Edward P. Bradbury, pen name of Michael Moorcock (born 1939), English writer
Garrett Bradbury (born 1995), American football player
Henry Bradbury (1829–1860), English writer
Jack Bradbury (1914–2004), American animator and comic book artist
Jason Bradbury (born 1969), British television presenter
John Bradbury (naturalist) (1768–1823), Scottish botanist
John Bradbury, 1st Baron Bradbury (1872–1950), British economist and public servant
John Bradbury, 3rd Baron Bradbury (born 1940), British peer, grandson of the 1st Baron
John Bradbury (drummer) (19532015), English musician and record producer, best known as drummer with The Specials
John Bradbury (footballer, born 1878) (born 1878), English footballer
Joshua B. Bradbury (1849–1918), American politician
Julia Bradbury (born 1970), British television presenter
Julie Bradbury (born 1967), English badminton player
Lee Bradbury (born 1975), English professional football player
Leone C. Bradbury (1905–1983), American artist
Malcolm Bradbury (1932–2000), British author and academic
Martyn "Bomber" Bradbury (born 1974), New Zealand television host and blogger
Nicola Bradbury (born 1951), English literary critic and editor
Norris Bradbury (1909–1997), American physicist, director of the Los Alamos National Laboratory
Randy Bradbury (born 1964), American punk rock musician
Ray Bradbury (1920–2012), American science fiction and fantasy writer
Steven Bradbury (speed skater) (born 1973), Australian short-track speed skater
Steven G. Bradbury (born 1958), American lawyer
Stephen Bradbury (artist) (born 1954), British illustrator and painter
William Bradbury (disambiguation), several people

See also
William Bradbery, British watercress pioneer, 1808

References 

English-language surnames
English toponymic surnames